Building management (in the UK) is a discipline that comes under the umbrella of facility management. Hard services usually relate to physical, structural services such as fire alarm systems, lifts, and so on whereas soft services allude to cleaning, landscaping, security, and suchlike human-sourced services.

Building manager
A building manager is a person who supervises the hard and soft services of a built structure. There are essentially two types of building manager positions: residential and commercial.

Residential building management
In a residential environment, a building manager will typically supervise a team of porters or concierge, cleaners, electrical and mechanical contractors, and depending on the size of the development, a team of administrative staff. If the development comprises several blocks, it is common that the Building Manager will report to an estate manager although both titles have become interchangeable. To a lesser extent, the term "development manager" is also used. Traditionally, this role's title was "house manager". The disparity in the job titles can reflect some differences in the job description but in essence, the title that perhaps best defines the role is that of building services manager as the main aspect of the job relates to the day-to-day running of the development with particular focus on the maintenance, site staff management, health and safety and presentation of the building or residential complex. The biggest challenge in the role is to manage residents' expectations and match these up to the budget constraints and prevalent legal requirements.

Managing agent
An external property management company that will issue and chase up the service charges, supervise the annual budget, and approve any additional works and requirements so that the development complies with current health and safety legislation and to ensure that the residential development, building, or estate is maintained in accordance with the lease requirements and the service level agreement determined by both the lease and the service charge levied. They also manage the on-site staff (i.e. the building manager and his team). They do this on behalf of the freeholder and they are only responsible for maintaining the communal areas and not the apartments themselves which are referred to in property management jargon as the "demised premises".

Leaseholders
The owners of the apartments can be at the same time occupiers but in some cases, they will be investors. They are responsible for the maintenance of their apartments (known as demised premises) and they pay an annual service charge, inclusive of a fee, to the managing agent for managing the communal parts.

Freeholder
The freeholder has possession over the freehold of the development (i.e. the communal areas and the land the site was built on). Normally, the freeholder is the developer but in some developments, the leaseholders, when formed into a residents association, purchase the freehold this is known as an RMC and the residents need to form a company with rules and regulations, a secretary a chairman and must make a copy of their annual accounts available to Companies House.

Contracted maintenance companies
The contracted maintenance companies that have been appointed to maintain the plants and systems of the building (fire alarms, electrical and mechanical systems, CCTV, intercom systems, car park, landscaping, etc.)These contracted companies must comply with all the relevant health and safety legislation and code of practices applicable to their sector and must as well offer a good service at competitive prices since the building services manager or the property manager will need to justify these costs to the leaseholders and freeholder.

External regulatory bodies
External regulatory bodies include local councils, Health Education Officers, and Fire Safety Officers. It is because of this delicate balance of powers that the job of the building manager could be described as a "balancing" act since it will be down to him or her to ensure that all parties are satisfied.

The building manager with the assistance and guidance of the managing company he or she works for will implement renovation, maintenance, and repair projects as required. The challenge can be in many cases to balance these requirements with important priorities such as those dictated by the Fire, Health, and Safety legislation as well as following the industry's codes of good practice and compliance. Both residential and commercial developments vary greatly in type depending on the standard, asset value and the service level agreement provided will depend on these factors.

Commercial building management
This subdivision of building management is quite similar to the previous one, the main difference being that the building will normally be made up of commercial units and or offices. The tenants will, in this case, be companies and the building manager will probably have some involvement in the sales aspect and will be responsible for ensuring that the office space is let at all times.

See also 
 Architectural management

References 

 The Institute of Residential Property Management
 The Association of Residential Managing Agents
 Facilities Management Association
 Japanese apartment management
 British Institute of Facilities Management
 Park, A. (1994) Facilities Management: An Explanation. Palgrave NY.

Property management